The desert pipistrelle (Hypsugo ariel) is a species of vesper bat  in the genus Hypsugo. It is found in Egypt, Israel, Jordan, Oman, Saudi Arabia, Sudan, and Yemen. Its natural habitats are subtropical or tropical dry shrubland, rocky areas, and hot deserts.

References

Hypsugo
Mammals described in 1904
Taxa named by Oldfield Thomas
Taxonomy articles created by Polbot
Bats of Africa
Mammals of Western Asia
Bats of the Arabian Peninsula